Ordu University is a public higher education established 2006 in Ordu, Turkey. Rector of the university is Prof. Dr. Ali Akdoğan.

Affiliations
The university is a member of the Caucasus University Association.

See also
List of universities in Turkey
List of colleges and universities
List of colleges and universities by country

References

External links
 Ordu University

State universities and colleges in Turkey
Universities and colleges in Turkey
Educational institutions established in 2006
2006 establishments in Turkey